The Fleet Market was a London market erected in 1736 on the newly culverted River Fleet. The market was located approximately where the modern Farringdon Street stands today, to the west of the Smithfield livestock market.

Work began in 1734 to arch over the River Fleet, as it had become an open sewer; and to remove the considerable expense of clearing the river of rubbish and filth. The course of the river was covered between Holborn Bridge and Fleet Bridge (now Ludgate Circus). The market, consisting of two rows of open one–storey shops linked by a covered walkway, opened on 30 September 1737. The market replaced the Old Stocks Market that itself had been cleared for the construction of the Mansion House.

To the north of the market, vegetables were sold in an open-air market. The centre was marked by a clock tower; and the south was adjacent to the Fleet Prison.

By 1829, the market was dilapidated and considered an obstacle to the increasing volume of traffic; and was cleared for the construction of Farringdon Road. Farringdon Market was constructed to replace it, but was never successful.

References

Former buildings and structures in the City of London
Former retail markets in London
1736 establishments in England
1829 disestablishments in England